Creswell is a city in the Willamette Valley of Lane County, Oregon, United States, located  south of Eugene, Oregon. The population at the 2010 census was 5,031.

History
The first store opened at Creswell in 1872, and a town sprang up around it. The city was named for John Creswell, 23rd United States Postmaster General. A post office has been in operation in Creswell since 1872.

Geography 

Demographics

2010 census
As of the census of 2010, there were 5,031 people, 1,906 households, and 1,366 families living in the city. The racial makeup of the city was 89.6% White, 0.4% African American, 1.0% Native American, 1.0% Asian, 0.1% Pacific Islander, 4.1% from other races, and 3.7% from two or more races. Hispanic or Latino of any race were 8.6% of the population.

There were 1,906 households, of which 37.3% had children under the age of 18 living with them, 54.2% were married couples living together, 12.6% had a female householder with no husband present, 4.8% had a male householder with no wife present, and 28.3% were non-families. 21.7% of all households were made up of individuals, and 7.1% had someone living alone who was 65 years of age or older. The average household size was 2.61 and the average family size was 3.01.

The median age in the city was 35.7 years. 26.8% of residents were under the age of 18; 6.9% were between the ages of 18 and 24; 28.9% were from 25 to 44; 25.7% were from 45 to 64; and 11.8% were 65 years of age or older. The gender makeup of the city was 48.7% male and 51.3% female.

2000 census
As of the census of 2000, there were 3,579 people, 1,271 households, and 911 families living in the city. The population density was 2,957.0 people per square mile (1,142.0/km). There were 1,343 housing units at an average density of 1,109.6 per square mile (428.5/km). The racial makeup of the city was 89.02% White, 0.31% African American, 1.82% Native American, 0.53% Asian, 0.17% Pacific Islander, 4.08% from other races, and 4.08% from two or more races. Hispanic or Latino of any race were 7.01% of the population. There were 1,271 households, out of which 41.4% had children under the age of 18 living with them, 53.1% were married couples living together, 13.5% had a female householder with no husband present, and 28.3% were non-families. 21.6% of all households were made up of individuals, and 8.7% had someone living alone who was 65 years of age or older. The average household size was 2.77 and the average family size was 3.21.

In the city, the population 31.3% under the age of 18, 8.5% from 18 to 24, 30.8% from 25 to 44, 18.4% from 45 to 64, and 11.0% who were 65 years of age or older. The median age was 32 years. For every 100 females, there were 90.5 males. For every 100 females age 18 and over, there were 89.7 males.

The median income for a household in the city was $34,053, and the median income for a family was $40,709. Males had a median income of $28,583 versus $22,917 for females. The per capita income for the city was $13,736. About 15.3% of families and 19.0% of the population were below the poverty line, including 24.1% of those under age 18 and 5.3% of those age 65 or over.

Parks and recreation
Creswell is the home of the Emerald Valley Golf Club. The course is located on  along the west bank of the Willamette River's Coast Fork. It was built in 1966 by James and Eugene Russell. After a series of owners, businessman Jim Pliska bought the golf course in 2002.  Today, Emerald Valley Golf Club is the home of the University of Oregon golf team.

Education 
The Creswell School District has three schools: Creslane Elementary School, Creswell Middle School, and Creswell High School.

Media
The Creswell Chronicle is the city's weekly newspaper

Controversy

On 4th July 2021 citizens held an unauthorized Independence Day parade after the city cancelled the official one.

Transportation
The city has a general aviation airport, Hobby Field, (IATA airport code:77S, ICAO airport code: 77S), and is located on Interstate 5 and Oregon Route 99. Lane County Transit (LTD) has limited bus service to Creswell.

Notable people 

 Mark Few, head coach for the Gonzaga Bulldogs men's basketball team
 Luke Jackson, basketball player

References

External links 
Entry for Creswell in the Oregon Blue Book

 
Cities in Oregon
Cities in Lane County, Oregon
1909 establishments in Oregon
Populated places established in 1909